Ahesta Bero or Ohista Birav, literally "walk slowly" ("walk graciously"), is a musical composition played to welcome the bride and groom's entrance to the wedding hall in weddings in Afghanistan, Azerbaijan, Tajikistan, Uzbekistan, and parts of Pakistan.

Usually the accompanied couple is walked slowly under the sanction of the Qur'an, as the attending guests rise in honor of the holy book. This anthem is a very strong tradition in these marriage ceremonies.

The song was originally a Kharabati song from Afghanistan.

Lyrics
The following is a transliteration of the Dari version of the song.

External links
Ahesta Bero Mahe Man, from afghansonglyrics.com

See also
Afghan wedding

Wedding songs
Central Asia
Year of song unknown
Songwriter unknown